Somerville High School is a public, four-year high school in Somerville, Massachusetts, United States. The school offers a wide selection of classes and vocational programs.

Classes offered include music, performing arts, journalism, TV and media production, ceramics, and computer applications. There are vocational programs in health careers, childhood development, electrical work, carpentry, auto repair, advanced manufacturing, graphic communications, drafting, cosmetology, culinary arts, and metal fabrication.

Reconstruction 

Somerville High School underwent extensive rebuilding in the late 2010s and early 2020s. Planning began in 2012, and voters passed a Proposition  override in 2016. Construction began in April 2018, displacing students. The original 1895 building was retained, as was the facade of the 1929 War Memorial. A new connected building opened to a small number of high-need students in various grades on March 4, 2021, during the COVID-19 pandemic in Massachusetts. Construction on the auditorium and cosmetology lab was still in progress, and new athletic fields are expected to be complete by spring 2022. A new broadcast studio is shared with the city government, and the 750-person auditorium and a 100-person lecture hall will be available for community events.

Extracurricular

Clubs and societies 
Somerville High School students participate in a wide range of self-run extracurricular clubs and societies. Competitive clubs include its Trivia Team, Science League, and a FIRST Robotics Competition team: 6201 The Highlanders.

The Trivia team has sent students to compete at WGBH's High School Quiz Show. They have competed on the show six times. Their most recent appearance was in the 2018–2019 school year.

In the 2015–2016 school year, The Highlanders won Highest Rookie Seed and Rookie Inspiration Award. In the 2016–2017 school year, the Highlanders won Creativity Award, Gracious Professionalism as well as placing for Districts Championship and placing  for the FIRST World Championship in St. Louis. In the 2018–2019 school year, The Highlanders won the Team Spirit Award.

Student publications 
Somerville High School publishes an online student newspaper, Highlander News.

Sports

Somerville High School has a sports program, highlighted by the recent success of its Cross Country team, that went 6–0 in the Greater Boston League in 2007, 2008, 2009 and 2010, capturing the GBL championship each season. The girls' indoor track team was successful, going undefeated and also capturing the GBL indoor track championship in the 2007–08 through 2010 seasons. Somerville High's outdoor track team also won the GBL Championships, with an undefeated winning streak for the 2008 through 2011 seasons.

The Football and Basketball Cheerleading team captured the National Championship title in Florida both in 2003 and in 2007, and has won the GBL title numerous times.

Gosder Cherilus earned Boston Globe and Boston Herald All-Scholastic honors as a senior at Somerville High School. He played tackle on both sides of the ball, and was named to Tom Lemming's All-America team in 2002. He also captured 2002 All-State accolades from the Mass. State Coaches Association. Cherilus also excelled on Somerville's basketball and track teams, and was selected with the 17th overall pick in the 2008 NFL Draft by the Detroit Lions.

Theater 
Highlander Theatre Company is Somerville High School's theater department. Highlander Theatre Company usually presents three to four productions per year: a musical, a full-length play a student-run fringe festival, and sometimes a touring festival play. Students participate as actors, crew, student directors, stage managers, and more. All sets, lights, and sound for productions are designed and operated by students. 

In response to the COVID-19 pandemic, the 2020-2021 season was changed to feature a full-length play, multiple 
works written and/or directed by students, and a one-act musical. Performances took place virtually, using both video conferencing technology and pre-recorded techniques. A modified four-show season would run for the 2021-2022 school year, signalling Highlander Theatre Company's return to in-person theatre.

Guinness World Record
On June 2, 2015, 59 Somerville High students attempted to break the world record for "most arm-linked people to stand up from the floor simultaneously." The previous world record is 49 people. After a total of 19 tries, the students managed to successfully stand up twice. Documentation footage was sent to the Guinness World Record Committee for further validation.

On June 19, 2015, the Guinness World Record Committee officially verified and confirmed that 59 Somerville High School students officially set the new world record for "most arm-linked people to stand up from the floor simultaneously." The school received its first certificate in August 2015.

Notable alumni
 Mike Capuano, former mayor of Somerville and congressman of Massachusetts's 7th congressional district
 Gosder Cherilus, National Football League player
 Joseph Curtatone, former mayor of Somerville
 Henry Hansen, Iwo Jima, World War II
 Frank Harris Hitchcock, former United States Postmaster General
 Shanty Hogan, former Major League Baseball player
 James "Hutch" Hutchinson, studio musician and long time Bonnie Raitt bassist
Eric Kebbon, FAIA, American Architect - 1890-1964 - 1908 Class President
 Danny MacFayden, former Major League Baseball player
 Stephen Mahoney, former Boston College head football coach
 Connie Morella, former congresswoman of Maryland's 8th congressional district
 Charlie Osgood, former Major League Baseball player
 Annie Stevens Perkins (born 1868), writer
 Boris Pickett, singer songwriter
 Maurice Roberts , former National Hockey League player
 Pie Traynor, former Major League Baseball third baseman and Baseball Hall of Famer
 Phil Reavis, competitor in the high jump at the 1956 Olympics
 Sturniolo Triplets, famous Youtube and TikTok stars

References

External links
 

Somerville, Massachusetts
Schools in Middlesex County, Massachusetts
Public high schools in Massachusetts
Educational institutions established in 1852
1852 establishments in Massachusetts
Hartwell and Richardson buildings